is a compilation album by Japanese singer/songwriter Mari Hamada, released on February 23, 2005 by Tri-M/MidZet House. The sequel to 1989's Sincerely, it is Hamada's second ballad-oriented album, featuring four new songs and two re-recordings of her past hits. This was her last release under the MidZet House label, with Tokuma Japan's reorganization transferring her to the Meldac label on her next release.

Sincerely II peaked at No. 132 on Oricon's albums chart.

Track listing

Charts

References

External links 
  (Mari Hamada)
 Official website (Tokuma Japan)
 

2005 compilation albums
Japanese-language compilation albums
Mari Hamada compilation albums
Tokuma Shoten albums